Lupumlo Mguca (born ) is a South African rugby union player for the  in the Pro14 and the  in the Currie Cup. His regular position is prop.

References

South African rugby union players
Living people
1997 births
Rugby union players from Port Elizabeth
Rugby union props
Eastern Province Elephants players
Southern Kings players